Biathlon at the 2018 Winter Paralympics was held at the Alpensia Biathlon Centre. The eighteen events took place on 10, 13 and 16 March 2018.

Events
The program included six event types (three for men and three for women) that were divided into three classifications each (sitting, standing, and visually impaired), for a total of 18 events. Standing biathletes are those that have a locomotive disability but are able to use the same equipment as able-bodied skiers, whereas sitting competitors use a sitski. Skiers with a visual impairment compete with the help of a sighted guide and an acoustic aiming system. The skier with the visual impairment and the guide are considered a team, and dual medals are awarded.

Men's events
 7.5 km
 12.5 km
 15 km
Women's events
 6 km
 10 km
 12.5 km

Competition schedule
The following is the competition schedule for all events.

All times are local (UTC+9).

Medal summary

Medal table

Women's events

Men's events

See also
Biathlon at the 2018 Winter Olympics
Multi-Medallists - biathlon  IPC – Official website

References

External links
Official Results Book – Biathlon

 
2018 Winter Paralympics events
Winter Paralympics
2018
Biathlon competitions in South Korea